is the seventh single by Bump of Chicken. The title track is from the album Flame Vein. The B-side is an acoustic version of "Ever Lasting Lie", from the album The Living Dead. The song's lyrics were inspired by the fictional character Rei Ayanami from the anime series Neon Genesis Evangelion.

Track listing

Personnel
Motoo Fujiwara — guitar, vocals
Hiroaki Masukawa — lead guitar
Yoshifumi Naoi — bass
Hideo Masu — drums

Chart performance

References

External links
アルエ on the official Bump of Chicken website.

2004 singles
Bump of Chicken songs
Neon Genesis Evangelion
2004 songs
Toy's Factory singles
Songs written by Motoo Fujiwara